Pixar Canada (stylized as P I X A R – C A N A D A) was a short-lived, wholly owned subsidiary of Pixar Animation Studios. It was located in Vancouver, British Columbia. The studio was tasked to produce short films based on Pixar’s feature film characters.

Pixar Animation Studios permanently closed Pixar Canada in October 2013, and laid off its approximately 100 employees to refocus Pixar’s efforts at its main headquarters in Emeryville, California. The former studio space is currently Industrial Light & Magic’s studio in Vancouver.

History
Pixar Canada was established in May 2009, and officially opened on April 20, 2010 in the area of Gastown, Vancouver, British Columbia. The location was chosen for tax incentive reasons, for Vancouver’s computer-generated animation talent pool and for time-zone compatibility with the  main studio in Hollywood. 

The studio’s initial three-year plan was to produce animated short films, based on established film characters by Pixar, to be shown in all of the related businesses within Disney, including television, DVD compilations, internet, theme park attractions, and theatrical presentations. Post-production and stereoscopic work in 3D remained in the hands of the main studio of Pixar in Emeryville, California.
 Among the films produced were Air Mater, Small Fry, and Partysaurus Rex. Pixar’s shorts also became a proving ground for new directors and for concepts for the studio.

In October 2013, Walt Disney Studios announced its closure, with a loss of nearly 100 jobs. A company spokesperson said the work done in Vancouver would be transferred to the company’s headquarters in Burbank, California. Provincial Jobs Minister Shirley Bond described the closure of the Pixar studio as “disappointing”, but added that she saw the decision as being tied to the company’s overall business strategy, rather than the business climate in British Columbia. 

Shortly after the closure of the studio, Disney, which had recently acquired Lucasfilm and its subsidiary companies, Industrial Light & Magic (ILM)’s satellite division in Vancouver, moved into Pixar Canada’s former studio. The ILM studio in Vancouver has subsequently carried out primary character animation and visual effects with the ILM headquarters in San Francisco on several Hollywood films, including Warcraft, The Revenant, and Thor: Ragnarok.

Filmography

References

External links

  Archived from the original on August 8, 2013

Pixar
Canadian animation studios
Disney production studios
Cinema of British Columbia
Companies based in Vancouver
Defunct companies of British Columbia
Mass media companies established in 2009
Mass media companies disestablished in 2013
2009 establishments in British Columbia
2013 disestablishments in British Columbia
Canadian companies established in 2009
Canadian companies disestablished in 2013
Canadian subsidiaries of foreign companies